Fox is a brevity code used by NATO pilots to signal the simulated or actual release of an air-to-air munition or other combat function. Army aviation elements may use a different nomenclature, as the nature of helicopter-fired weapons is almost always air-to-surface. "Fox" is short for "foxtrot", the NATO phonetic designation for the letter "F", which is short for "fire". The radio call announcing that a weapon has been fired is intended to help avoid friendly fire, alerting other pilots to avoid maneuvering into the path of the munition.

There are four variations of the Fox brevity word in use, with a number added to the end of Fox to describe the primary type of sensors the launched munition possesses (if applicable).
Fox one Indicates launch of a semi-active radar-guided missile (such as the AIM-7 Sparrow).
Fox two Indicates launch of an infrared-guided missile (such as the AIM-9 Sidewinder).
Fox three Indicates launch of an active radar-guided missile (such as the AIM-120 AMRAAM). 
Before the introduction of Active radar homing missiles in the 1980’s, Fox three was the callsign for guns in an air to air role, which has been re-designated as Fox four.
Fox four (GUNS) Indicates usage of guns in an air to air role, formerly designated as Fox three.

See also
Multiservice tactical brevity code

References

External links
Multiservice Brevity Codes from the Defense Technical Information Center

Brevity codes
Military aviation